Days of Our Own is a 2016 Chinese coming-of-age drama film directed by Joe Ma and Liu Hai and starring Zhao Liying, Qiao Renliang, Emma Wu, Van Fan and Feng Mingchao. It was released in China on September 2, 2016.

Plot
The story follows three different girls with unique personalities in a span of 10 years (2003-2013), as they grow and work toward their dreams. 
Zhang Jingyi is an intelligent tomboy and her motto in life is for everyone to be happy; Chen Yinuo is a rich, temperamental girl from a wealthy family; and Liang Xiaoyi is a girl desperate to reach her dreams.

Cast
Zhao Liying
Qiao Renliang
Emma Wu

Van Fan
Feng Mingchao

References

Chinese romantic drama films
2016 romantic drama films
Films directed by Joe Ma
Chinese coming-of-age films
Chinese teen films
2010s Mandarin-language films